Baselios Cleemis (born 15 June 1959) is the current major archbishop-catholicos of the Syro-Malankara Catholic Church. He was named to the College of Cardinals of the Catholic Church by Pope Benedict XVI on 24 November 2012.

At the moment of his selection, he was the youngest member of the College of Cardinals. He is the first cardinal of the Syro-Malankara Catholic Church. On 31 January 2013, he was named a member of the Congregation for the Oriental Churches and the Pontifical Council for Interreligious Dialogue. He served as President of the Catholic Bishops' Conference of India from 2014 to 2018, and previously served as Chairman of the Kerala Catholic Bishops' Council.

Early life
Baselios Cleemis was born on 15 June 1959 as Isaac Thottumkal (alternatively spelled as Thottunkal) in Mukkoor, a small village close to Mallappally town in Pathanamthitta district in the State of Kerala in South India. His parents are Mathew and Annamma Thottumkal. The Thottumkal (Powathikunnel Thottumkal) family is a part of the Pakalomattom family, which is an ancient Saint Thomas Christian family in Kerala.

Education
He attended the Minor Seminary Formation in Tiruvalla from 1976 to 1979. He received a B.Phil. degree from St. Joseph's Pontifical Institute, Mangalapuzha, Aluva, where he attended from 1979 to 1982. He received a B.Th. degree from the Papal Seminary, Pune where he attended from 1983 to 1986. Thottunkal was ordained a priest on 11 June 1986. He studied for the Master of Theology in Dharmaram College, Bangalore  where he attended from 1986 to 1989. Thottunkal took his Doctorate in Ecumenical Theology from Pontifical University of St. Thomas Aquinas (Angelicum), Rome in 1997.

Full Name and Titles 
His Eminent Beatitude Cardinal, Moran Mor Baselios Cleemis Catholica Bava, Major Archbishop-Catholicos of Thiruvananthapuram. Baselios and Maphrian are also a titles used in the Eastern Catholic churches for bishops of high rank granted by the Holy See to the Malankara Syrian Catholic Church on 6 November 1995.

Episcopal career
On his return from Rome he became the Vicar General (Proto Syncellus) of the Eparchy of Bathery. Pope John Paul II nominated Aboon Isaac Mar Cleemis as Apostolic Visitor and the Auxiliary Bishop of Trivandrum on 18 June 2001 for the Syro-Malankarites residing in North America and Europe. He was consecrated on 15 August 2001 at Tirumoolapuram, Tiruvalla, assuming the name Isaac Mar Cleemis.

The Holy See appointed Cleemis as sixth Bishop of the Eparchy of Tiruvalla on 11 September 2003. Cleemis was installed as the first Metropolitan Archbishop of the Archieparchy of Tiruvalla on 10 June 2006.

Baselios Cleemis was unanimously elected as the Catholicos of the Syro-Malankara Catholic Church through the first Holy Episcopal Synod of election of the Syro-Malankara Catholic Church convoked on 7–10 February 2007 at Catholicate Centre, Pattom, Trivandrum. Pope Benedict XVI approved the election on 9 February and it was announced on 10 February at St. Mary's Cathedral, Pattom, Trivandrum. He assumed the name Baselios Cleemis; Cleemis was enthroned the Second Major Archbishop of the Syro-Malankara Catholic Church on 5 March 2007 at St. Mary's Cathedral, Pattom, Trivandrum. Cardinal Telesphore Toppo and Cardinal Varkey Vithayathil participated in the installation ceremony.

Cleemis was elevated to the College of Cardinals of the Catholic Church by Pope Benedict XVI on 24 November 2012. As Cardinal-Priest he was assigned the titular church of San Gregorio VII. He is the first bishop of the Syro-Malankara Church and the fifth Keralite to be named a cardinal. He said it was a sign of the Pope's appreciation of Indian Catholics' "unity in diversity", and cited the witness, the defense of human life, and the example of authentic prayer given by Mother Teresa of Kolkata.

On 31 January 2013, Cleemis was appointed by Pope Benedict XVI to serve as a Member of the Congregation for the Oriental Churches and the Pontifical Council for Interreligious Dialogue.

Cleemis participated as a cardinal-elector in the conclave that elected Pope Francis. Because he was the first bishop from the Syro-Malankara Church to be made cardinal, he also was the first cardinal from the Syro-Malankara Church ever to participate as a cardinal-elector in a papal conclave.

References

External links

 
 
The Hindu report on Cardinal
Syro-Malankara Catholic Church
Syro-Malankara Catholic Church – alternative site built by Malankarites
Times of India, News

21st-century Roman Catholic archbishops in India
21st-century Eastern Catholic archbishops
1959 births
Living people
Syro-Malankara bishops
Pontifical University of Saint Thomas Aquinas alumni
Indian cardinals
Cardinals created by Pope Benedict XVI
Members of the Congregation for the Oriental Churches